Mayer Morjada is a Bangladeshi Bengali-language film. The film released in 2006 all over Bangladesh. It was directed and written by Dilip Biswas. It is a family-based romantic comedy film. The film stars Manna, Shakib Khan  Mousumi, Shabnur, Bobita, Sohel Rana, Humayun Faridi and Dolly Johur. This is the last film of director Dilip Biswas. Manna, Shakib Khan, Moushumi, and Shabnur are seen together on screen for the first and last time in this film.

Plot

Cast
 Manna as Rajib
 Shakib Khan as Badhon
 Moushumi as Rini
 Shabnur as Megha
 Bobita
 Sohel Rana as Advocate Zahid Hossain, Badhon's father 
 Humayun Faridi
 Dolly Johur
 Pirzada Shahidul Harun
 Prabir Mitra
 Sushoma Alam
 Dr. Ezazul Islam
 A K M Hasan
 Saju Khadem
 Ratan

Production

Crew
 Director: Dilip Biswas
 Producer: Gaiatri Biswas &Debashish Biswas
 Story: Dilip Biswas
 Script: Dilip Biswas
 Music: Imon Saha
 Lyrics: Kabir Bokul
 Cinematography: Abul Kaibe
 Editing: Minto
 Distributor: Geeti Chitrakotha

Technical details
 Format: 35 MM (Color)
 Real: 13 Pans
 Original Language: Bengali
 Country of Origin: Bangladesh•Date of Theatrical Release: 2006
 Technical Support: Bangladesh Film Development Corporation (BFDC)

Soundtrack

The film's music was directed by Bangladeshi famous music director Imon Saha. The lyrics were written by Gazi Mazharhul Anwar.

Soundtrack

References

2006 romantic comedy films
2006 films
Bengali-language Bangladeshi films
Bangladeshi romantic comedy films
Films scored by Emon Saha
2000s Bengali-language films